The Ministry of Higher Education is a ministry in Zambia. It oversees university and vocational, training, science, technology and innovation and is headed by the Minister of Higher Education.

The current ministry was established in 2005 after being split from the Ministry of Education, which was renamed the Ministry of General Education. It had existed previously as the Ministry of Science, Technology and Vocational Training. Prior to that, there had been a Deputy Minister at the Ministry of Education responsible for technical education.

List of ministers

Deputy ministers

References

External links
Official website

Higher Education
Education in Zambia
 
Zambia
Zambia